The 1999 NASCAR Winston Cup Series was the 51st season of professional Stock car racing in the United States, the 28th modern-era Cup series, and the last Cup season of the 1990s and the 20th century. The season began on Sunday, February 7, and ended on Sunday, November 21. Dale Jarrett, representing Robert Yates Racing, was crowned the champion, while the NASCAR Manufacturers' Championship was won by the Ford drivers with 13 wins and 231 points over second-place Chevrolet who had 12 wins and 210 points and third place Pontiac who had 9 wins and 205 points.

In December 1999, NASCAR announced that starting in February 2001, the Winston Cup Series and Busch Grand National Series would be broadcast live on FOX/FX and NBC/TBS (later TNT).

As of 2022, this is the last season without any current NASCAR drivers.

Teams and drivers

Complete schedule

Limited schedule

 Mike Harmon was released just before the Daytona 500 and never drove or attempted any of the races in 1999.

Schedule

Races

Bud Shootout 
The Bud Shootout, an exhibition race for drivers who had won a pole position in the previous season or had won the event before, was held on February 7 at Daytona International Speedway. Rusty Wallace drew the pole.

Top ten results

 6-Mark Martin
 33-Ken Schrader
 18-Bobby Labonte
 31-Mike Skinner
 12-Jeremy Mayfield
 22-Ward Burton
 2-Rusty Wallace
 88-Dale Jarrett
 98-Rick Mast
 28-Kenny Irwin Jr.

Gatorade Twin 125s 
The Gatorade Twin 125s, a pair of qualifying races for the Daytona 500, were held February 11 at Daytona International Speedway. Jeff Gordon and Tony Stewart won the pole positions for the races, respectively.

Race one: top ten results
 18-Bobby Labonte
 24-Jeff Gordon
 99-Jeff Burton
 33-Ken Schrader
 6-Mark Martin
 26-Jimmy Spencer
 7-Michael Waltrip
 77-Robert Pressley
 40-Sterling Marlin
 5-Terry Labonte

Race two: top ten results
 3-Dale Earnhardt
 12-Jeremy Mayfield
 88-Dale Jarrett
 2-Rusty Wallace
 31-Mike Skinner
 20-Tony Stewart
 16-Kevin Lepage
 4-Bobby Hamilton
 22-Ward Burton
 30-Derrike Cope

Dale Earnhardt wins his 12th Gatorade 125 at Daytona, an all-time record. Earnhardt also wins his 10th straight Gatorade 125, another NASCAR record. With his 10th straight victory, Earnhardt won every Gatorade 125 event of the 1990s (1990-1999), becoming the only driver in NASCAR history to win an event for an entire decade. This would also be Dale Earnhardt's 28th and final career Daytona NASCAR win. Along with his 12 Gatorade 125 wins, he has 7 wins in the season opener for the Busch Series, 6 wins in the Busch Clash, 2 wins in the Pepsi 400, and a win in the 1998 Daytona 500.

Daytona 500 

The 1999 Daytona 500 was held February 14 at Daytona International Speedway. Jeff Gordon won the pole. In winning the race as well, he became the first Daytona 500 pole sitter to win the race since Bill Elliott in 1987. This race is known for Gordon's daring three-wide pass on Rusty Wallace and Mike Skinner. Gordon passed Wallace after ducking to the apron, nearly plowing into the damaged car of Ricky Rudd. Skinner jumped to the outside and they raced three-wide for three laps until Dale Earnhardt gave Gordon the needed push. The race was also known for a determined Dale Earnhardt repeatedly trying to pass Jeff Gordon for the lead on the final lap, but Gordon beat Earnhardt to the finish. The race was also marked by a large crash on lap 135 in turn 3 that collected 13 cars and saw Dale Jarrett flip over twice.

 24-Jeff Gordon
 3-Dale Earnhardt
 28-Kenny Irwin Jr.
 31-Mike Skinner
 7-Michael Waltrip
 33-Ken Schrader
 44-Kyle Petty
 2-Rusty Wallace
 97-Chad Little
 98-Rick Mast

Failed to qualify: 50-Dan Pardus*, 59-Mark Gibson, 72-Jim Sauter, 48-Glen Morgan, 81-Morgan Shepherd, 78-Gary Bradberry, 73-Ken Bouchard, 15-Jeff Green, 80-Andy Hillenburg, 84-Stanton Barrett, 47-Billy Standridge, 41-David Green, 00-Buckshot Jones*, 91-Steve Grissom, 13-Dick Trickle, 79-Norm Benning.

This would be the 3rd and final time in his career that Jeff Gordon would win 3 straight NASCAR races (last 2 races of 1998 and 1st race of 1999).
This was the first Winston No Bull 5 race of the season. Jeff Gordon won the million-dollar bonus.
This was Jeff Gordon's 2nd Daytona 500 win in 3 years.
This was the first Winston Cup race for future Cup champion Tony Stewart.

Dura Lube/Big K 400 
The Dura Lube/Big K 400 was held February 21 at North Carolina Speedway. Ricky Rudd won the pole.

Top ten results

 6-Mark Martin
 88-Dale Jarrett
 18-Bobby Labonte
 99-Jeff Burton
 12-Jeremy Mayfield
 31-Mike Skinner
 5-Terry Labonte
 60-Geoff Bodine
 4-Bobby Hamilton
 2-Rusty Wallace

Failed to qualify: Derrike Cope (No. 30), Buckshot Jones (No. 00), Billy Standridge (No. 50), Rich Bickle (No. 45)

Jeff Gordon lost his bid at another 4 straight victories (which would be the last 2 races of 1998 and the 1st race of 1999, the Daytona 500), and for the first time since the previous June Richmond race, Gordon failed to finish in the top 10. He would finish the race in 39th due to a blown engine, and he would fall from 1st to 11th in points.

Las Vegas 400 
The Las Vegas 400 was held March 7 at Las Vegas Motor Speedway. Bobby Labonte won the pole. The Burton brothers, Jeff and Ward, both led for a combined 182 of the race's 267 laps.  In the end, after a great battle for the lead in the race's closing moments, Jeff would pass brother Ward and hold on for the win.

Top ten results

 99-Jeff Burton
 22-Ward Burton
 24-Jeff Gordon
 31-Mike Skinner
 18-Bobby Labonte
 36-Ernie Irvan
 3-Dale Earnhardt
 5-Terry Labonte
 2-Rusty Wallace
 6-Mark Martin

Failed to qualify: Ted Musgrave (No. 75), Kyle Petty (No. 44), Robert Pressley (No. 77), Ron Hornaday Jr. (No. 50), Butch Gilliland (No. 38), Dave Marcis (No. 71), Morgan Shepherd (No. 92), Ron Burns (No. 68), Austin Cameron (No. 89)

 This was the second Winston No Bull 5 race for 1999.

Cracker Barrel 500 
The Cracker Barrel 500 was held March 14 at Atlanta Motor Speedway. Bobby Labonte won the pole.

Top ten results

 24-Jeff Gordon
 18-Bobby Labonte
 6-Mark Martin
 99-Jeff Burton
 88-Dale Jarrett
 31-Mike Skinner
 36-Ernie Irvan
 22-Ward Burton
 97-Chad Little
 7-Michael Waltrip

Failed to qualify: Robert Pressley (No. 77), Steve Grissom (No. 91), Morgan Shepherd (No. 90), Harris DeVane (No. 08)

This would be Jeff Gordon's 35th win in 100 straight races, and in the last 100 NASCAR Cup Series Races as well (both all-time records). His streak began when he won at Richmond, the 3rd race of the 1996 season.

TranSouth Financial 400 
The TranSouth Financial 400 was held March 21 at Darlington Raceway. Jeff Gordon won the pole. The race was halted on lap 164 due to rain and never resumed.  Jeff Burton (the leader at the time) was involved in a multi-car wreck that occurred just as the rain started pouring, but managed to limp across the start/finish line to take the win. Jeff Gordon was running 2nd before being passed by Jeremy Mayfield after being involved in the same wreck. Gordon still finished 3rd.  Prior to the race, Bobby Labonte injured his shoulder in a practice crash. Bobby started the race, but on the first pit stop, Matt Kenseth relieved Labonte and would go on to finish 10th.

Top ten results

 99-Jeff Burton
 12-Jeremy Mayfield
 24-Jeff Gordon
 88-Dale Jarrett
 6-Mark Martin
 20-Tony Stewart
 4-Bobby Hamilton
 22-Ward Burton
 43-John Andretti
 18-Bobby Labonte

Failed to qualify: Derrike Cope (No. 30), Dave Marcis (No. 71), Rich Bickle (No. 45)
First career top-10 for Tony Stewart.

Primestar 500 
The Primestar 500 was held March 28 at Texas Motor Speedway. Kenny Irwin Jr. won the pole.

Top ten results

 5-Terry Labonte
 88-Dale Jarrett
 18-Bobby Labonte
 2-Rusty Wallace
 12-Jeremy Mayfield
 20-Tony Stewart
 99-Jeff Burton
 3-Dale Earnhardt
 40-Sterling Marlin
 21-Elliott Sadler
Failed to qualify: Dick Trickle (No. 91), Stanton Barrett (No. 90), Kyle Petty (No. 44), Dave Marcis (No. 71), Ken Bouchard (No. 84)

This race would end under the caution flag as with just a couple laps to go Jimmy Spencer was involved in an accident, bringing out the yellow flag.
This race was notable for Terry Labonte claiming a home state victory. This would be Terry's last win until the 2003 Southern 500 at Darlington, 4 years and 157 races later.
This race would be the first of only three times in his career that Jeff Gordon finished last in a 43-car field. Coincidentally, the only other times he finished 43rd out of 43 cars was at the spring Texas and Phoenix races both in 2008.

Food City 500 
The Food City 500 was held April 11 at Bristol Motor Speedway. Rusty Wallace won the pole.

Top ten results

 2-Rusty Wallace
 6-Mark Martin
 88-Dale Jarrett
 43-John Andretti
 99-Jeff Burton
 24-Jeff Gordon
 75-Ted Musgrave
 44-Kyle Petty
 22-Ward Burton
 3-Dale Earnhardt

Failed to qualify: Rich Bickle (No. 45), Stanton Barrett (No. 90), Derrike Cope (No. 30), Carl Long (No. 85)

Rusty Wallace led 425 of the 500 laps on his way to a dominating victory. This was Wallace's 49th career win, putting him 10th on the NASCAR all time win list.
 Jeff Gordon was involved in a multi-car crash with about 50 laps left, but because so few cars were left on the lead lap, Gordon was able to rally to a sixth-place finish.

Goody's Body Pain 500 
The Goody's Body Pain 500 was held on April 18 at Martinsville Speedway. Tony Stewart won the pole.

Top ten results

 43-John Andretti
 99-Jeff Burton
 24-Jeff Gordon
 31-Mike Skinner
 6-Mark Martin
 55-Kenny Wallace
 2-Rusty Wallace
 88-Dale Jarrett
 33-Ken Schrader
 44-Kyle Petty

Failed to qualify: Dave Marcis (No. 71), Morgan Shepherd (No. 90), Buckshot Jones (No. 00)

 This was the last time until the 2014 Coke Zero 400 that the famous 43 car visited victory lane in a Cup Series race.
 Last win for John Andretti and Petty Enterprises.
 First career pole for Tony Stewart.

DieHard 500 
The DieHard 500 was held April 25 at Talladega Superspeedway. Ken Schrader won the pole.

Top ten results

 3 -Dale Earnhardt
 88-Dale Jarrett
 6 -Mark Martin
 18-Bobby Labonte
 20-Tony Stewart
 33-Ken Schrader
 55-Kenny Wallace
 9 -Jerry Nadeau
 43-John Andretti
 94-Bill Elliott

Failed to qualify: Ken Bouchard (No. 84), Dan Pardus (No. 50), Derrike Cope (No. 30), Loy Allen Jr. (No. 90), Dick Trickle (No. 91)
First career top-5 for Tony Stewart.

California 500 presented by NAPA 

The California 500 presented by NAPA was held May 2 at California Speedway. Since qualifying was rained out the lineup was set by owner's points, and Jeff Burton started on the pole.

Top ten results

 24-Jeff Gordon
 99-Jeff Burton
 18-Bobby Labonte
 20-Tony Stewart
 88-Dale Jarrett
 22-Ward Burton
 12-Jeremy Mayfield
 25-Wally Dallenbach Jr.
 5-Terry Labonte
 31-Mike Skinner 1 lap down

Failed to qualify: Boris Said (No. 14), Hut Stricklin (No. 90), Buckshot Jones (No. 00), Butch Gilliland (No. 38)

Pontiac Excitement 400 

The Pontiac Excitement 400 was held May 15 at Richmond International Raceway. Jeff Gordon won the pole.

Top ten results

 88-Dale Jarrett
 6-Mark Martin
 18-Bobby Labonte
 4-Bobby Hamilton
 2-Rusty Wallace
 42-Joe Nemechek
 44-Kyle Petty
 3-Dale Earnhardt
 22-Ward Burton
 45-Rich Bickle

Failed to qualify: Buckshot Jones (No. 00), Dave Marcis (No. 71), Hut Stricklin (No. 90)

 After troubles by points leader Jeff Burton, Dale Jarrett would not only win this race, but inherit the points lead and hold it for the rest of 1999.

The Winston 
The Winston, NASCAR's all-star race, was held May 22 at Lowe's Motor Speedway. Bobby Labonte won the pole.

Top ten results

 5-Terry Labonte
 20-Tony Stewart
 24-Jeff Gordon
 3-Dale Earnhardt
 12-Jeremy Mayfield
 60-Geoff Bodine
 40-Sterling Marlin
 7-Michael Waltrip
 94-Bill Elliott
 43-John Andretti

This was Terry Labonte's second win in the Winston. His first one came 11 years earlier in 1988, making this the longest time span between first and second wins in the All-Star Race for any driver in NASCAR history.

Coca-Cola 600 

The Coca-Cola 600 was held May 30 at Lowe's Motor Speedway. Bobby Labonte won the pole.

Top ten results

 99-Jeff Burton
 18-Bobby Labonte
 6-Mark Martin
 20-Tony Stewart
 88-Dale Jarrett
 3-Dale Earnhardt
 33-Ken Schrader
 22-Ward Burton 1 lap down
 31-Mike Skinner 1 lap down
 12-Jeremy Mayfield 1 lap down

 Dale Earnhardt Jr. made his NASCAR Winston Cup debut at this race, achieving a 16th-place finish.
 Jeff Burton collected an extra million dollars for winning the third Winston No Bull 5 race of the season.

Failed to qualify: Jeff Green (No. 01), Dick Trickle (No. 91), Dave Marcis (No. 71), Derrike Cope (No. 30), Ricky Craven (No. 58), Dan Pardus (No. 50), Morgan Shepherd (No. 05), Randy LaJoie (No. 14), Carl Long (No. 85)

MBNA Platinum 400 

The MBNA Platinum 400 was held June 6 at Dover Downs International Speedway. Bobby Labonte won the pole. For the second straight year in this race, fuel strategy did not play out in favor of Jeff Gordon, as he would again have to pit for fuel in the race's closing laps, giving the lead away to Bobby Labonte in this race who would lead the final six laps.

Top ten results

 18-Bobby Labonte
 24-Jeff Gordon
 6-Mark Martin 1 lap down
 20-Tony Stewart 1 lap down
 88-Dale Jarrett 1 lap down
 2-Rusty Wallace 1 lap down
 26-Johnny Benson 1 lap down
 99-Jeff Burton 1 lap down
 12-Jeremy Mayfield 2 laps down
 28-Kenny Irwin Jr. 2 laps down

Failed to qualify: Darrell Waltrip (No. 66), Buckshot Jones (No. 00), Hut Stricklin (No. 90)

This was Darrell Waltrip's first DNQ since the 1997 UAW-GM Quality 500 at Charlotte. As NASCAR has implemented a maximum limit of the past champion's provisional to a total of eight, Waltrip had exhausted all of his provisionals prior to this race. He would miss a total of seven races this season.
As of 2021, this is the last time where only two drivers finish on the lead lap.

Kmart 400 
The Kmart 400 was held June 13 at Michigan Speedway. Jeff Gordon won the pole.

Top ten results

 88-Dale Jarrett
 24-Jeff Gordon
 99-Jeff Burton
 22-Ward Burton
 18-Bobby Labonte
 1-Steve Park 1 lap down
 36-Ernie Irvan 1 lap down
 43-John Andretti 1 lap down
 20-Tony Stewart 2 laps down, DNF-out of gas.
 6-Mark Martin 2 laps down

Failed to qualify: Dave Marcis (No. 71), Hut Stricklin (No. 90), Buckshot Jones (No. 00)

This race was run caution-free. It was therefore the fastest NASCAR Cup race at MIS, with Dale Jarrett's average speed being 173.997 mph. As of 2021d, this would be the last ever non-restrictor plate race to be caution-free. In 2017, NASCAR would make a three-stage format for every race of the season, and at a certain lap at the end of each stage, they would throw the caution flag, thus making it that a race can no longer be caution-free.
This was the last career Winston Cup race in which Ernie Irvan lead a lap.

Pocono 500 

The Pocono 500 was held June 20 at Pocono Raceway. Sterling Marlin won the pole. This race is mostly remembered for a hard crash from veteran Dave Marcis on Lap 91 when he got loose at turn two and when trying to correct it, spun hard right and slammed into the wall at a high speed, getting some air and destroying his car. He emerged from the wreck without injury.

Top ten results

 18-Bobby Labonte
 24-Jeff Gordon
 88-Dale Jarrett
 40-Sterling Marlin
 6-Mark Martin
 20-Tony Stewart
 3-Dale Earnhardt
 36-Ernie Irvan
 12-Jeremy Mayfield
 4-Bobby Hamilton

Failed to qualify: Hut Stricklin (No. 90), Loy Allen Jr. (No. 58), Derrike Cope (No. 30)

Save Mart/Kragen 350 

The Save Mart/Kragen 350 was held June 27 at Sears Point Raceway. Jeff Gordon won the pole.

Top ten results

 24-Jeff Gordon
 6-Mark Martin
 43-John Andretti
 2-Rusty Wallace
 23-Jimmy Spencer
 88-Dale Jarrett
 12-Jeremy Mayfield
 44-Kyle Petty
 3-Dale Earnhardt
 7-Michael Waltrip

Failed to qualify: R. K. Smith (No. 71), Austin Cameron (No. 89), Sean Woodside (No. 58), John Metcalf (No. 70), Mike Borkowski (No. 09), Boris Said (No. 14), Steve Portenga (No. 96), David Murry (No. 61)

 Two flips occurred in the race: First when the No. 1 of Steve Park got sideways in turn 1, hitting the guardrail and flipping once. He was uninjured. The No. 33 of Ken Schrader flipped as well in the same area of the track Park had crashed earlier. Schrader got sideways, causing the car to go over the fence and roll two and a half times. Schrader was also uninjured.
 Jeff Gordon won the race despite hard charges by Mark Martin and being extremely sick. This was also Jeff's second straight win at Sears Point Raceway and his fourth straight win on a road course.

Pepsi 400 

The Pepsi 400 was held July 3 at Daytona International Speedway. Joe Nemechek won the pole.

Top ten results

 88-Dale Jarrett
 3-Dale Earnhardt
 99-Jeff Burton
 31-Mike Skinner
 18-Bobby Labonte
 20-Tony Stewart
 22-Ward Burton
 4-Bobby Hamilton
 36-Ernie Irvan
 5-Terry Labonte

Failed to qualify: Derrike Cope (No. 30), Hut Stricklin (No. 91), Ken Bouchard (No. 84), Robert Pressley (No. 77), Stanton Barrett (No. 90)

This would be the 3rd and final time that "The Dale and Dale Show" finished 1st and 2nd at Daytona. Dale Jarrett defeated Dale Earnhardt in all 3 races (1993 & 1996 Daytona 500s, and 1999 Pepsi 400).
With a couple of laps left, Jeremy Mayfield and Jimmy Spencer spun off of turn 4, bringing out the yellow flag and ending the race under the caution flag.
Final career top-10 for Ernie Irvan.

Jiffy Lube 300 

The Jiffy Lube 300 was held July 11 at New Hampshire International Speedway. Jeff Gordon won the pole.

Top ten results

 99-Jeff Burton
 55-Kenny Wallace
 24-Jeff Gordon
 88-Dale Jarrett
 94-Bill Elliott
 6-Mark Martin
 25-Wally Dallenbach Jr.
 3-Dale Earnhardt
 23-Jimmy Spencer
 20-Tony Stewart

Failed to qualify: Robert Pressley (No. 77), Derrike Cope (No. 30), David Green (No. 41), Dave Marcis (No. 71)

 Tony Stewart was only a couple of laps away from notching his first Winston Cup Series win when he ran out of fuel.

Pennsylvania 500 
The Pennsylvania 500 was held July 25 at Pocono Raceway. Mike Skinner won the pole.

Top ten results

 18-Bobby Labonte
 88-Dale Jarrett
 6-Mark Martin
 20-Tony Stewart
 25-Wally Dallenbach Jr.
 5-Terry Labonte
 45-Rich Bickle
 1-Steve Park
 3-Dale Earnhardt
 31-Mike Skinner

Failed to qualify: Derrike Cope (No. 30), Morgan Shepherd (No. 91)

 With this win, Bobby Labonte completed a rare sweep of races at Pocono Raceway in one season.
 Elliott Sadler injured his left foot during qualifying. Morgan Shepherd was on standby but was not needed to relieve Elliott.
 This was the final race where Ken Squier was the play-by-play announcer.

Brickyard 400 

The Brickyard 400 was held August 7 at Indianapolis Motor Speedway. Jeff Gordon won the pole.

Top ten results

 88-Dale Jarrett
 18-Bobby Labonte
 24-Jeff Gordon
 6-Mark Martin
 99-Jeff Burton
 22-Ward Burton
 20-Tony Stewart
 2-Rusty Wallace
 10-Ricky Rudd
 3-Dale Earnhardt

Failed to qualify: Rich Bickle (No. 45), Boris Said (No. 14), Brett Bodine (No. 11), Dick Trickle (No. 91), Steve Grissom (No. 01), Morgan Shepherd (No. 05), Jeff Davis/Lance Hooper (No. 62), Stanton Barrett (No. 90), Mike Wallace (No. 32), Gary Bradberry (No. 80), Buckshot Jones (No. 00), Bob Strait (No. 61)

 Just one year after Jeff Gordon became the first repeat Brickyard 400 winner, Dale Jarrett redeemed himself after running out of fuel took him out of top contention in last year's race and followed in Gordon's footsteps to become the second repeat Brickyard 400 winner.
 Jarrett's victory would be the last time a Ford would take the checkered flag first at this race until Brad Keselowski's victory in 2018, nearly 20 years later.

Frontier at The Glen 

The Frontier at The Glen was held August 13 at Watkins Glen International. Rusty Wallace won the pole.  Jeff Gordon would lead 55 of the race's 90 laps on his way to his third straight win at Watkins Glen and his fifth straight win overall on a road course.

Top ten results

 24-Jeff Gordon
 87-Ron Fellows*
 2-Rusty Wallace
 88-Dale Jarrett
 9-Jerry Nadeau
 20-Tony Stewart
 25-Wally Dallenbach Jr.
 44-Kyle Petty
 31-Mike Skinner
 6-Mark Martin

Failed to qualify: Robert Pressley (No. 77), Derrike Cope (No. 30), Paul Gentilozzi (No. 19), Jack Baldwin (No. 91), Hut Stricklin (No. 58), Dave Marcis (No. 71)

5th consecutive road course win for Jeff Gordon.
This would unexpectedly be the 47th and final career victory for Ray Evernham as a crew chief.
This was Ernie Irvan's last NASCAR Winston Cup race.
Ron Fellows finished a career-best 2nd-place finish in the #87 Bully Hill Vineyards Chevrolet.
This was Jack Baldwin's lone Cup Series qualifying attempt

Pepsi 400 presented by Meijer 

The Pepsi 400 presented by Meijer was held August 22 at Michigan Speedway. Ward Burton won the pole.

Top ten results

 18-Bobby Labonte
 24-Jeff Gordon
 20-Tony Stewart
 88-Dale Jarrett
 3-Dale Earnhardt
 97-Chad Little
 6-Mark Martin
 23-Jimmy Spencer
 58-Hut Stricklin
 43-John Andretti

Failed to qualify: Derrike Cope (No. 30), Stanton Barrett (No. 90), Darrell Waltrip (No. 66), Brett Bodine (No. 11), Tom Hubert (No. 19)
This was the race weekend that saw former Michigan winner Ernie Irvan crashed hard during Busch Series practice, similar to a crash that he was involved in during the 1994 event. Dick Trickle subbed for Irvan for this race and then Jerry Nadeau took over for the remainder of the season.
Also during the race weekend Team SABCO and Joe Nemechek announced that they would part ways at the end of the season.

Goody's Headache Powder 500 

The Goody's Headache Powder 500 was held August 28 at Bristol Motor Speedway. Tony Stewart won the pole.

Top ten results

 3-Dale Earnhardt
 23-Jimmy Spencer
 10-Ricky Rudd
 24-Jeff Gordon
 20-Tony Stewart
 6-Mark Martin
 40-Sterling Marlin
 5-Terry Labonte 1 lap down
 22-Ward Burton 1 lap down
 33-Ken Schrader 1 lap down

This race came under some controversy when on the last lap, Dale Earnhardt spun out leader Terry Labonte, who collected Ricky Rudd and Stewart. Earnhardt was booed as he pulled into victory lane.  On lap 490, Earnhardt would inherit the lead after leader Terry Labonte spun after the caution flag was just brought out with 9 laps to go.  Because of the low number of lead lap cars left in the race, Terry was able to pit for tires during the caution flag and make a hard charge to the front when the race was back green.  Labonte got by Earnhardt for the lead coming to the white flag then Earnhardt got into him in turns 1 and 2.

Failed to qualify: Rich Bickle (No. 45), Dick Trickle (No. 91)

Pepsi Southern 500 

The 50th Pepsi Southern 500 was held September 5 at Darlington Raceway. Kenny Irwin Jr. won the pole.

Top ten results

 99-Jeff Burton
 22-Ward Burton
 12-Jeremy Mayfield
 6-Mark Martin
 16-Kevin Lepage
 42-Joe Nemechek
 4-Bobby Hamilton
 2-Rusty Wallace
 33-Ken Schrader
 1-Steve Park

Failed to qualify: Todd Bodine (No. 30), Stanton Barrett (No. 90)

 Jeff Burton once again collected one million dollars for his victory in the fourth Winston No Bull 5 race of 1999.
 The race was halted on lap 270 due to rain.
 During the weekend of this race, Ernie Irvan announced his immediate retirement from racing due to injuries he suffered while testing his Busch Series car at Michigan International Speedway the previous month.

Exide NASCAR Select Batteries 400 

The Exide NASCAR Select Batteries 400 was held September 11 at Richmond International Raceway. Mike Skinner won the pole.

Top ten results

 20-Tony Stewart*
 18-Bobby Labonte
 88-Dale Jarrett
 40-Sterling Marlin
 28-Kenny Irwin Jr.
 3-Dale Earnhardt
 4-Bobby Hamilton
 75-Ted Musgrave
 43-John Andretti 1 lap down
 8-Dale Earnhardt Jr. 1 lap down

Failed to qualify: Jack Sprague (No. 45), Dave Marcis (No. 71), Hut Stricklin (No. 58), Stanton Barrett (No. 90), Tom Baldwin (No. 91)
This was Tony Stewart's first NASCAR Winston Cup win. Stewart led 333 of the race's 400 laps.
Stewart would be the first rookie since Davey Allison in 1987 to win a NASCAR points race.
First career top ten for Dale Earnhardt Jr.
Last career top ten for Ted Musgrave.

Dura Lube/Kmart 300 
The Dura Lube/Kmart 300 was held September 19 at New Hampshire International Speedway. Rusty Wallace won the pole.

Top ten results

 42-Joe Nemechek*
 20-Tony Stewart
 18-Bobby Labonte
 99-Jeff Burton
 24-Jeff Gordon
 2-Rusty Wallace
 26-Johnny Benson
 22-Ward Burton
 98-Rick Mast
 28-Kenny Irwin Jr.

Failed to qualify: Darrell Waltrip (No. 66), Derrike Cope (No. 91), Dick Trickle (No. 41), Andy Belmont (No. 79)
This was Joe Nemechek's first NASCAR Winston Cup win. It was bittersweet as weeks earlier it was announced that Joe would not return to Team SABCO for the year 2000.
For the second week in a row, a first-time winner won the race.
This race ended under the caution flag.

MBNA Gold 400 
The MBNA Gold 400 was held September 26 at Dover Downs International Speedway. Rusty Wallace won the pole.

Top ten results

 6-Mark Martin
 20-Tony Stewart
 88-Dale Jarrett
 17-Matt Kenseth
 18-Bobby Labonte
 99-Jeff Burton
 97-Chad Little 1 lap down
 3-Dale Earnhardt 1 lap down
 1-Steve Park 1 lap down
 28-Kenny Irwin Jr. 1 lap down

Failed to qualify: Dick Trickle (No. 41), Todd Bodine (No. 30), Darrell Waltrip (No. 66), Derrike Cope (No. 91), Andy Belmont (No. 79)
First career top-5 for Matt Kenseth.
First time in his career that Darrell Waltrip would fail to qualify back-to-back races.

NAPA AutoCare 500 

The NAPA AutoCare 500 was held October 3 at Martinsville Speedway. Joe Nemechek won the pole.

Top ten results

 24-Jeff Gordon
 3-Dale Earnhardt
 60-Geoff Bodine
 2-Rusty Wallace
 55-Kenny Wallace
 31-Mike Skinner
 44-Kyle Petty
 18-Bobby Labonte
 99-Jeff Burton 1 lap down
 88-Dale Jarrett 1 lap down

Failed to qualify: Ron Hornaday Jr. (No. 01), Dick Trickle (No. 41), Tim Fedewa (No. 91), Morgan Shepherd (No. 05)

 It was announced prior to this race, that Jeff Gordon's crew chief Ray Evernham was leaving Hendrick Motorsports to oversee Dodge's return to NASCAR in 2001. Brian Whitesell was Gordon's crew chief for the remainder of 1999.

UAW-GM Quality 500 

The UAW-GM Quality 500 at Lowe's Motor Speedway was scheduled for October 10 but was held October 11 due to rain. Bobby Labonte won the pole.

Top ten results

 24-Jeff Gordon
 18-Bobby Labonte
 31-Mike Skinner
 6-Mark Martin
 22-Ward Burton
 12-Jeremy Mayfield
 88-Dale Jarrett
 2-Rusty Wallace 1 lap down
 16-Kevin Lepage 1 lap down
 1-Steve Park 1 lap down

Failed to qualify: Darrell Waltrip (No. 66), Dave Marcis (No. 71), Ed Berrier (No. 90), Gary Bradberry (No. 80), Hut Stricklin (No. 58), Andy Hillenburg (No. 91)

With this win, Jeff Gordon was now two for two with Brian Whitesell as his interim crew chief, as the tandem had won their first race together a week ago at Martinsville.
1999 marked the 5th consecutive year that Jeff Gordon won 7+ races in a season, a NASCAR modern-era record. In 1995, he won 7 races, in both 1996 and 1997, he won 10 races in each season, and in 1998, he won 13 races. 1999 also marked the 5th consecutive year for Jeff Gordon winning the most races in a season, another NASCAR modern-era record. As of 2020, Gordon is so far still the only driver in NASCAR history to accomplish this feat.
This was the 49th career win for Jeff Gordon. This win would tie him with Rusty Wallace for 10th on the NASCAR all-time win list.
7th and final win of 1999 for Jeff Gordon.

Winston 500 
The Winston 500 was held October 17 at Talladega Superspeedway. Joe Nemechek won the pole.

Top ten results

 3-Dale Earnhardt
 88-Dale Jarrett
 10-Ricky Rudd
 22-Ward Burton
 55-Kenny Wallace
 20-Tony Stewart
 18-Bobby Labonte
 99-Jeff Burton
 4-Bobby Hamilton
 28-Kenny Irwin Jr.

Failed to qualify: Bobby Gerhart (No. 89), Robert Pressley (No. 77), Darrell Waltrip (No. 66), Hut Stricklin (No. 58)

As of 2021, Dale Earnhardt is the only driver in NASCAR history to pull off the season sweep at Talladega twice. His other season sweep was back in 1990. Drivers that pulled off the season sweep before him only did it once. Those drivers are Pete Hamilton back in 1970, Buddy Baker in 1975, and Darrell Waltrip in 1982. His son Dale Earnhardt Jr. would pull off the season sweep in 2002, and Jeff Gordon would do so as well in 2007.
This was the final Winston No Bull 5 race of 1999.  The top five finishing order would be eligible for the bonus at the 2000 Daytona 500.

Pop Secret Microwave Popcorn 400 
The Pop Secret Microwave Popcorn 400 was held October 24 at North Carolina Speedway. Mark Martin won the pole.

Top ten results

 99-Jeff Burton
 22-Ward Burton
 18-Bobby Labonte
 88-Dale Jarrett
 2-Rusty Wallace
 6-Mark Martin
 43-John Andretti
 40-Sterling Marlin
 12-Jeremy Mayfield 1 lap down
 4-Bobby Hamilton 1 lap down

Failed to qualify: Dave Marcis (No. 71), Rich Bickle (No. 91), Hut Stricklin (No. 58), Ed Berrier (No. 90)

This would be the third time this season that the Burton brothers would finish 1–2, with younger brother Jeff winning all three races over older brother Ward. Three times would be the most times in one season that a set of brothers finished first and second.
During the weekend for this race, the No. 58 SBIII Motorsports team closed its doors due to a sponsorship pullout.
6th and final win of 1999 for Jeff Burton.

Checker Auto Parts/Dura Lube 500 
The Checker Auto Parts/Dura Lube 500 was held November 7 at Phoenix International Raceway. John Andretti won the pole.

Top ten results

 20-Tony Stewart
 6-Mark Martin
 18-Bobby Labonte
 99-Jeff Burton
 10-Ricky Rudd
 88-Dale Jarrett
 44-Kyle Petty
 43-John Andretti
 25-Wally Dallenbach Jr.
 24-Jeff Gordon

Failed to qualify: Mike Wallace (No. 32)

Tony Stewart would be the first rookie since Davey Allison in 1987 to win two races in his rookie season.
As of 2022, this is the fastest Cup race run at Phoenix.

Pennzoil 400 presented by Kmart 

The inaugural Pennzoil 400 presented by Kmart was held November 14 at Homestead-Miami Speedway. David Green won the pole. This was the first NASCAR Cup Series race televised on NBC Sports.

Top ten results

 20-Tony Stewart
 18-Bobby Labonte
 99-Jeff Burton
 6-Mark Martin
 88-Dale Jarrett
 31-Mike Skinner
 44-Kyle Petty
 3-Dale Earnhardt 1 lap down
 25-Wally Dallenbach Jr. 1 lap down
 24-Jeff Gordon 1 lap down

Failed to qualify: Dave Marcis (No. 71), Ed Berrier (No. 90), Derrike Cope (No. 41), Andy Belmont (No. 04), Bob Strait (No. 61)
This was Ted Musgrave's final race as a full-time Winston Cup series regular.  Musgrave quit the Butch Mock Motorsports team after this race.  He would later re-surface in the Craftsman Truck Series and find success, winning 15 career races and the series championship in 2005.
Dale Jarrett clinched the Winston Cup Series championship with one race to go. In Bob Latford's Winston Cup points system, a driver can clinch the championship with one race to go if he has a point margin of 185+ over 2nd, and Jarrett did just that by having a 211-point lead over Bobby Labonte at the end of the race.
Tony Stewart won his 3rd race of 1999, breaking Davey Allison's record for most wins in a rookie season. He would become the 1st rookie to win 3 races in one season. Stewart also became the 1st, and as of 2020, the only rookie in NASCAR history to win back-to-back races.

NAPA 500 

The NAPA 500 was held November 21 at Atlanta Motor Speedway. Kevin Lepage won the pole.

Top ten results

 18-Bobby Labonte
 88-Dale Jarrett
 12-Jeremy Mayfield
 6-Mark Martin
 99-Jeff Burton
 97-Chad Little
 10-Ricky Rudd
 31-Mike Skinner
 3-Dale Earnhardt
 4-Bobby Hamilton

Failed to qualify: Darrell Waltrip (No. 66), Derrike Cope (No. 15), Hut Stricklin (No. 75), Ricky Craven (No. 50), Stacy Compton (No. 9), Morgan Shepherd (No. 05)

Bobby Labonte won the 1999 NAPA 500, despite taking a provisional to make the race. He started back in the 37th position.
Dale Jarrett would officially finish his championship season 201 points over runner-up Bobby Labonte.
Dale Jarrett's 1999 Championship season came with 29 top 10 finishes in 34 races, which was a NASCAR record. That record stood until the 2007 season when Jeff Gordon finished with 30 top 10s in 36 races.
After 16 straight seasons with at least one victory from 1983 to 1998, Ricky Rudd failed to keep his winning streak alive in 1999. His 16-season winning streak of at least one race came to a total of 20 wins. His best finish in the 1999 season was 3rd place twice (Goody's Headache Powder 500 and Winston 500). 16 straight seasons with at least 1 win was a NASCAR Modern Era record, a record that was tied with Rusty Wallace in 2001, and future champion Jimmie Johnson in 2017. In 2021, another future champion, Kyle Busch,  became the Modern Era record holder after winning in Kansas, marking his 17th consecutive year of winning at least 1 race. Not only is he the Modern Era Record leader with 17 straight seasons, Busch is currently tied for 2nd All-Time with David Pearson (1964-1980). 18 straight seasons is the All-Time Record, which is held by Richard Petty. Petty went on to win 185 races from 1960 to 1977.

Final points standings

(key) Bold - Pole position awarded by time. Italics - Pole position set by owner's points standings. *- Most laps led.

Rookie of the Year
The 1999 Rookie of the Year battle was expected to be one of the most competitive in years. However, it ended up proving to be a runaway as Tony Stewart won three races and finished fourth in points. Elliott Sadler, who was considered the top favorite for the award during the pre-season, only had one top-ten finish and was the only rookie besides Stewart to complete the full schedule. Buckshot Jones was another favorite, but a long string of DNQs and DNFs forced him to cut back his schedule and abandon his run for the award. Stanton Barrett began the year with his own team, then left for Junie Donlavey, only making two races. Dan Pardus hoped to run a part-time schedule with Midwest Transit Racing, but he did not qualify for any of his attempts, and was released after the Coca-Cola 600. Finally, Mike Harmon was scheduled to drive the No. 90, but did not even attempt a race after a sponsorship fallout with Big Daddy's BBQ Sauce.

Gallery

See also
1999 NASCAR Busch Series
1999 NASCAR Craftsman Truck Series

References

External links
 Winston Cup Standings and Statistics for 1999

 
NASCAR Cup Series seasons